Mark Fernald (born March 21, 1959) is an American politician who served in the New Hampshire Senate from the 11th district from 1998 to 2002. He unsuccessfully ran for governor against Craig Benson in 2002, then unsuccessfully ran for Senate from the 9th district in 2018, where he was defeated by Jeanne Dietsch in the primary election.

References

|-

1959 births
Living people
Democratic Party New Hampshire state senators